Orhanlı can refer to:

 Orhanlı, İhsaniye
 Orhanlı, Niğde
 Orhanlı, Yeşilova